Night Patrol is a 1984 American comedy film starring Linda Blair, Pat Paulsen, Andrew Dice Clay, Billy Barty, and Murray Langston. The actor Murray Langston, who portrayed Melvin White, acted as his usual stage persona The Unknown Comic within the film. Linda Blair received a Razzie Award for Worst Actress in 1985. Reception of the film was generally negative.

Plot 

Melvin White is an inept policeman who is demoted to night patrol by his pathologically lying captain, who has excessive flatulence. White's partner is Kent Lane, who has been a police officer for ten years and loves nothing more than having sex with women in the back of his police car. Fellow police officer Sue Perman is attracted to White, but White does not understand her hints and thinks of her as only a buddy. White and Lane get involved in various situations that include a couple parked in front of a fire hydrant, people smoking marijuana which they join in, and a male rape victim with a high-pitched voice. In between his duties as a police officer, White is the stand-up comedian The Unknown Comic at night. While in his persona, White wears a paper bag over his head that has holes for his eyes and mouth. White is popular as The Unknown Comic, and he has a chance to become even more famous and rich when a talent agent seeks him out. Edith Hutton, a fan of White, is attracted to The Unknown Comic and wants to discover who is under the paper bag. Hutton is even willing to leave her current boyfriend for him. White also has sessions with a psychiatrist.

Things become more complicated for White when a thief begins to rob bars at gunpoint while disguised as The Unknown Comic. No one is aware of The Unknown Comic's identity, but his captain has a suspicion that it is White. To prove that he is innocent, while also trying to hide his stand-up comedian identity, White works with Lane to track down who is impersonating him. White is supposed to perform at a venue as The Unknown Comic, but he is unable to do so because he is on the trail of the thief as a police officer within that venue. An impersonator of the comedian shows up on stage to perform, while another impersonator enters the place to steal money. White and his partner chase the thief and lose sight of the person on stage. The two of them catch up to the thief, resulting in White and the thief having a Western-film-style gun draw duel. The victor of the duel is White, and an unmasking reveals the impersonator is his psychiatrist, who says he wanted to become rich in White's place. White then finds and confronts the second impersonator, who turns out to be Perman. Perman used a recording of White's voice to protect him from being arrested. The film then ends with Perman and White having sex at White's apartment.

Production and release
The actor Murray Langston, who portrayed Melvin White, acted as his real-life The Unknown Comic persona within the film. It is the second film directed by Jackie Kong, who co-wrote the script with Murray Langston, William A. Levey and Bill Osco. Kong also edited the film. Andrew Dice Clay has a cameo appearance as a stand-up comedian named Tony Maroni. Pat Morita has a bit part in the film as a rape victim.

The film was released in theaters by New World Pictures on November 16, 1984. It was released on DVD on July 22, 2004.

Reception
Vincent Canby of The New York Times wrote a positive review, stating, "Though the humor is strictly for the stag-party crowd, which isn't discriminating, the performances have a good, low-burlesque style to them".

A review from TV Guide said in a negative review, "This police comedy does the impossible: It makes POLICE ACADEMY (1984) look like a piece of sophisticated humor". Richard Christiansen of the Chicago Tribune also gave a negative review: "Night Patrol appears to have been made by subnormal persons weaned on Blazing Saddles, Animal House and Police Academy".

Linda Blair received a Razzie Award in 1985 for Worst Actress.

References

External links
 
 

1984 films
1984 comedy films
Films shot in Los Angeles
American comedy films
Films scored by Michael Hoenig
Golden Raspberry Award winning films
New World Pictures films
1980s English-language films
Films directed by Jackie Kong
1980s American films